Pool is an album by John Zorn featuring his early "game piece" composition of the same name which was first released on vinyl on Parachute Records in 1980 as a double album including the composition "Hockey". The album was released on CD on Tzadik Records with an additional bonus track featuring a test recording of Archery as part of The Parachute Years Box Set in 1997 and as a single CD in 2000. The album was the first released solely under Zorn's name following his collaboration with Eugene Chadbourne, School (1978).

Reception
The AllMusic review by Joclyn Layne awarded the album 3 stars stating "Dedicated fans should check this out, as it is part of the early annals of Zorn. Listeners with less patience for music theory -- and Zorn skeptics -- should save Pool for later, because it will not win anyone over; nor will the compositional theories become more clear upon listening. Essentially, Pool has more historical value than listening interest."

Track listing
All compositions by John Zorn

Original Vinyl Release

    

CD Release
 "Pool" - 50:45	
 "Archery (test and false start)" - 3:30  Bonus track on CD release

Recorded at Sorcerer Sound Studio, New York City on March 1, 1980

Personnel
Polly Bradfield - Violin 
Mark E. Miller - Percussion, Contact Microphones, Vibraphone
Charles K. Noyes - Percussion, Saw, Knene
Bob Ostertag - Electronics 
John Zorn - Alto and Soprano Saxophones, Bb Clarinet, Game Calls, E-flat Clarinet

References

John Zorn albums
Tzadik Records albums
1980 albums